The Challenger Pro League (previously known as 1B Pro League) is the second-highest division in the Belgian football league system, one level below the Belgian First Division A. It was created by the Royal Belgian Football Association in 2016, replacing the Belgian Second Division. From the season 2016–17 until 2019–20, the competition was named Proximus League, after the main sponsor Proximus.

History
The Belgian First Division B was created in 2016 as the successor of the Belgian Second Division following an overhaul of the Belgian football league system which saw the number of professional clubs reduced to 24 and the number of teams at the second level of the football pyramid to 8.

During Belgian Second Division era from 1973 to 2016, the second division winner and the play-off winner promote to the first division. From 2016 on, the second division winner is no longer guaranteed promotion. The league is divided in two periods of 15 games. The winners of a period compete each other in a final. If a team wins both periods, no final is played and it automatically rises to the highest level. In 2017, Lierse became champion of the league, but no promotion was allowed because they did not win a period. Antwerp and SV Roeselare played the final.

Competition format

Until 2020
From its inception in 2016 until 2020, the season consisted of two separate competitions in which all 8 teams played each other twice. The winners of both competitions faced each other in a two-legged playoff with the winner crowned champions and promoted to the Belgian First Division A.

For the remaining teams, until 2019, the top three teams (excluding the promoted team), played together with the teams finishing in the positions 7 through 15 of the Belgian First Division A in a playoff for a ticket into the UEFA Europa League. The remaining four teams played a relegation playoff, with the last team relegating into the Belgian First Amateur Division. From 2019, the top six teams all took part in the Europa League playoffs (including the promoted team), with only the bottom two teams playing the relegation playoff in which they play each other five times.

2020 to 2022
The 2020–21 and 2021–22 seasons no longer involved two separate competitions, but rather one quadruple round-robin league in which all teams play each other four times. At the end of the season, the top-ranked team was crowned champions and promoted, while the second-placed team earned a two-legged promotion playoff against the 17th-place finisher from the Belgian First Division A for a place in the top division. The team finishing in last place was relegated to the Belgian National Division 1 (renamed from Belgian First Amateur Division).

From 2022
From the 2022–23 season onwards, the league was expanded to 12 teams, as from this season U23-teams no longer play in separate competitions but rather join the regular competition. To accommodate this expansion, the league format was changed again. Now all teams play a regular round-robin round (22 matches), after which the league splits into two halves, with the top 6 teams battling for promotion to the Belgian First Division A which only goes to the top team at the end of the season after 32 matches, while the bottom 6 also meet each other but with the goal of avoiding finishing last as this team will be relegated. Promotion/relegation playoffs are no longer organized, only the top and the bottom team at the end of the season change leagues. Furthermore, U23 teams will be able to be relegated from or promoted into the Belgian First Division B, but cannot earn promotion to the Belgian First Division A. The league was renamed to Challenger Pro League.

Past results overview

Broadcasting 
Proximus broadcast every game whilst it sponsored the league, Telenet broadcast one random game every week. As of the 2020–21 season, Eleven Sports acquired the broadcasting rights to all professional league games (1A, 1B and the Super Cup) in Belgium.

Footnotes

References

 
Sports leagues established in 2016
2016 establishments in Belgium
Second level football leagues in Europe
2
Professional sports leagues in Belgium